Lao Airlines State Enterprise is the national airline of Laos, headquartered in Vientiane. It operates domestic and international services to countries such as Cambodia, China, Japan, South Korea, Thailand, and Vietnam. Its main operating base is Wattay International Airport in Vientiane. It is subordinate to the Ministry of Public Works and Transport.

History 

In September 1976, the company was formed from the merger of existing airlines Royal Air Lao and Lao Air Lines. The company became Lao Aviation in 1979.

In 2000, a joint venture with China Yunnan Airlines and the Lao government was formed which re-nationalized Lao Aviation.

The A320s are the first jet aircraft to be purchased by Lao Airlines and feature a two-class layout seating 126 passengers in the main cabin and 16 in Business Class, and they are powered by CFM International CFM56 engines.

Destinations

Codeshare agreements
Lao Airlines has codeshare agreements with the following airlines:

 Cambodia Angkor Air
 Thai Airways
 Vietnam Airlines

Fleet
, Lao Airlines fleet consists of the following aircraft:

Retired fleet

Livery
Lao Airlines have the plumeria livery on the  vertical stabilizer. Plumeria is an official national flower of the Lao People's Democratic Republic. The words "Lao Airlines" are colored in blue.

Accidents and incidents
On 1 September 1979, a Lao Aviation Antonov An-26 (registration RDPL-34037) force-landed in a corn field at Ban Mai, Thailand, due to fuel exhaustion after the pilot became disorientated in heavy rain; all 74 passengers and crew survived, but the aircraft was substantially damaged; the aircraft was repaired and flown back to Vientiane on 31 January 1980 where it was written off after crashing on landing.
On 22 April 1990, a Lao Aviation Antonov An-24RV (registration RDPL-34008) overshot the runway at Luang Namtha Airport after an aborted takeoff; the aircraft collided with a building, killing one; all three on the aircraft survived.
On 13 December 1993, a Lao Aviation Harbin Y-12-II (registration RDPL-34117) crashed on approach to Phonesavanh Airport after clipping trees in fog, killing all 18 on board.
On 25 May 1998, a Lao Aviation Yakovlev Yak-40 (registration RDPL-34001) crashed in the jungle in heavy rain near Long Tieng, Xiangkhouang Province, killing all 26 on board. The aircraft was carrying a Vietnamese military delegation from Vientiane to Xiangkhouang.
On 19 October 2000, Lao Aviation Flight 703, a Harbin Y-12-II (registration RDPL-34130), crashed into mountainous terrain in bad weather while on approach to Sam Neua Airport en route from Vientiane; eight of 17 on board died.
On 14 February 2002, Flight 702, a Harbin Y-12-II (registration RDPL-34118) crashed on the runway while taking off from Sam Neua Airport due to a wind gust; all 15 on board survived, but the aircraft was written off; the engines were sent to Singapore to be rebuilt, the fuselage was cut up and sent to Vietnam for scrap metal.
On 16 October 2013, Flight 301, an ATR 72-600 (registration RDPL-34233) twin turboprop carrying 44 passengers and 5 crew, crashed into the Mekong River, at about 16:00 local time; all 49 on board died. The aircraft was flying from Vientiane to Pakse in Champasak Province in southern Laos, and was attempting to land in bad weather associated with Typhoon Nari.

References

External links

Lao Airlines official website
Champa Meuanglao, official inflight magazine

 
Airlines of Laos
Airlines established in 1976
Government-owned airlines
Economy of Vientiane
1976 establishments in Laos